Pichenettes is a comic strip in the series The spiffy adventures of McConey (Les formidables aventures de Lapinot in the original French language), by the popular French cartoonist Lewis Trondheim. It was first released in 1996 as volume 2 in the series.

An English translation, titled The Hoodoodad, was released in 1998.

This volume is often regarded by fans as one of the funniest and strongest entries in the series and contains several of the most popular quotes by Richard.

Plot 
This adventure takes place in modern France and uses the normal continuing storyline of the series. While walking on the street, Lapinot and Richard accidentally bump into a bum about to commit suicide. They prevent him from doing so despite his repeated attempts, and he eventually accepts to stop trying to kill himself as long as they accept to take his little stone which, according to him, is cursed and brings terrible bad luck to the bearer. Lapinot accepts, not taking him seriously, but most other characters around him seem to be plagued with bad luck from that moment on. Up until the end of the book, it isn't clear whether there is a real curse or if it all happens in the characters' minds.

French comics